Daniel Périgaud (born 19 December 1943) is a French footballer. He competed in the men's tournament at the 1968 Summer Olympics.

References

External links
 

1943 births
Living people
French footballers
Olympic footballers of France
Footballers at the 1968 Summer Olympics
Association football midfielders